The 1982–83 Challenge Cup was the 82nd staging of rugby league's oldest knockout competition, the Challenge Cup. Known as the State Express Challenge Cup for sponsorship reasons, the final was contested by Featherstone Rovers and Hull F.C. at Wembley. Featherstone won the match 14–12, and is considered one of the biggest upsets in Challenge Cup final history.

Preliminary round

First round

Second round

Third round

Semi final

Final
Hull F.C. returned to Wembley as defending champions, having won the Challenge Cup for the second time in their history in the previous year. Hull went into the match as strong favourites, but were surprisingly defeated by their opponents Featherstone Rovers.

References

External links
Challenge Cup official website 
Challenge Cup 1982/83 results at Rugby League Project

Challenge Cup
Challenge Cup
1983 in Welsh rugby league